James McPhail Gillies, CM (2 November 1924 – 13 December 2015) was a politician and economist in Canada. He was a Progressive Conservative member of the House of Commons of Canada from 1972 to 1979 who was elected in the Toronto, Ontario riding of Don Valley. He taught economics at the Schulich School of Business at York University and was sought after for commentary on economic issues.

Background
Gillies attended public and secondary school in Teeswater, Ontario. He then went to London, Ontario to attend University of Western Ontario. He joined the Royal Canadian Air Force in 1944 during World War II. In 1945 he continued his education in the United States at Brown University and Indiana University at Bloomington. He joined the faculty of University of California, Los Angeles's Graduate School of Management in 1951 and remained there until his return to Canada in 1965 where he was the initial dean of York University's Faculty of Administrative Studies, now named the Schulich School of Business.

Gillies was chair of the Ontario Economic Council in 1971 and 1972.

Politics
Gillies ran as a Progressive Conservative candidate in the 1972 federal election. He was elected in the riding of Don Valley defeating Liberal candidate Grant Ross by 6,962 votes. He was re-elected in 1974 and left federal office after completing his term in the 30th Canadian Parliament. In 1976, Gillies was a candidate for the leadership of the Progressive Conservative Party of Canada, placing 9th out of 11 candidates and withdrawing after the first ballot. He was a senior policy advisor to Prime Minister Joe Clark in the brief PC government of 1979-80.

Later life
He was named a professor emeritus of the Schulich School of Business and continued to provide commentary on economic matters. He died on 13 December 2015, aged 91.

Works
 Gillies, James M. (2010). From vision to reality: the founding of the Faculty of Administrative Studies at York University, 1965-1972.

Archives 
There is a James McPhail Gillies fonds at Library and Archives Canada. Archival reference number is R3294.

References

External links
 
 

1924 births
2015 deaths
Members of the House of Commons of Canada from Ontario
People from Bruce County
Politicians from Toronto
Progressive Conservative Party of Canada MPs
Canadian military personnel of World War II
University of Western Ontario alumni
Brown University alumni
Indiana University alumni
Academic staff of York University
UCLA Anderson School of Management faculty
Canadian economists
Progressive Conservative Party of Canada leadership candidates